The Philadelphia Wings are a lacrosse team based in Philadelphia, Pennsylvania playing in the National Lacrosse League (NLL). The 2021-2022 season is their 3rd season in the NLL.

Regular season

Final standings

Game log

Playoffs

Roster

Entry Draft
The 2021 NLL Entry Draft took place on August 28, 2021. The Wings made the following selections:

References

Philadelphia
Philadelphia Wings seasons
Philadelphia Wings